The Thomson Football Netball Club is an Australian rules football and netball club which has competed in the Geelong DFL since 1957.
It is based in the Geelong suburb of Thomson.

History
The Thomson Football Club was formed in 1953  by a group of local parents. The club would field a team in the local junior competition. Club meetings were held in the local Tate Street Primary School, the club would adopt the school colours of gold and purple for its jumper.
First match games were played at Richmond Crescent, East Geelong. Part way through the 1956 season the club moved to the Godfrey Street oval. The club would develop the site by building change room is 1967 and then a social club complex in 1980.

In 1957 a senior team was admitted to the Geelong DFL. Initially in the Woolworth cup competition it moved to the more rural Jarman Cup division and stayed there before being promoted back to the Woolworths cup in 1963 and then winning the premiership in 1964.

Premierships

VFL/AFL players 
Larry Donohue – 
David Manson -   
Paul Jeffreys -

Bibliography
 Cat Country: History of Football In The Geelong Region by John Stoward –

References

External links
 Official website

Geelong Football League clubs
Sports clubs established in 1953
Australian rules football clubs established in 1953
1953 establishments in Australia
Geelong & District Football League clubs
Netball teams in Geelong
Australian rules football clubs in Geelong